The Sacred Flame may refer to:

The Sacred Flame (play), 1928 play
The Sacred Flame (1929 film), an American film
The Sacred Flame (1931 film), a German-language version
 The Olympic flame, used in the Olympic torch relay.